Calathus brevis is a species of ground beetle from the Platyninae subfamily that is endemic to Spain.

References

brevis
Beetles described in 1866
Beetles of Europe
Endemic fauna of Spain